The Sangre de Cristo Mountains (Spanish for "Blood of Christ") are the southernmost subrange of the Rocky Mountains. They are located in southern Colorado and northern New Mexico in the United States. The mountains run from Poncha Pass in South-Central Colorado, trending southeast and south, ending at Glorieta Pass, southeast of Santa Fe, New Mexico.
The mountains contain a number of fourteen thousand foot peaks in the Colorado portion, as well as all the peaks in New Mexico which are over twelve thousand feet.

The name of the mountains may refer to the occasional reddish hues observed during sunrise and sunset, and when alpenglow occurs, especially when the mountains are covered with snow. Although the particular origin of the name is unclear, it has been in use since the early 19th century. Before that time the terms "La Sierra Nevada", "La Sierra Madre", "La Sierra", and "The Snowies" (used by English speakers) were used. According to legend, "sangre de Cristo" were the last words of a priest who was killed by Native Americans.

Land management and recreation overview

Much of the mountains are within various National Forests: the Rio Grande and San Isabel in Colorado, and the Carson and Santa Fe in New Mexico. These publicly accessible areas are managed by the United States Forest Service and are popular for hunting, camping, hiking, mountain biking, backpacking, climbing, and cross-country and downhill skiing.

The mountains include two large wilderness areas, the Sangre de Cristo Wilderness in Colorado and the Pecos Wilderness in New Mexico, as well as some smaller wilderness areas, such as Latir Peak Wilderness.  The Great Sand Dunes National Park and Preserve lies on the southwest side of the mountains in Colorado and are managed by the National Park Service.

Subranges
The Sangre de Cristo Mountains are divided into various subranges, described here from north to south. Use of the terms "Sangre de Cristo Range" and "Sangre de Cristo Mountains" is inconsistent and may refer to the northernmost subrange, the southernmost subrange, or the mountains as a whole.

Sangre de Cristo Range

The Sangre de Cristo Range, the largest and most northerly subrange of the Sangre de Cristo Mountains, runs directly along the east side of the Rio Grande rift, extending southeast from Poncha Pass for about 75 miles (120 km) through south-central Colorado to La Veta Pass, approximately 20 miles (32 km) west of Walsenburg. They form a high ridge separating the San Luis Valley on the west from the watershed of the Arkansas River on the east.

Crestones
The Crestones are a group of four 14,000+ foot (4,268+ m) peaks (fourteeners) in the Sangre de Cristo Range above Crestone, Colorado.

Spanish Peaks
The Spanish Peaks are a pair of mountains, West Spanish Peak, and East Spanish Peak, located in southwestern Huerfano County, Colorado. The Spanish Peaks were designated a National Natural Landmark in 1976 as one of the best known examples of igneous dikes.

Culebra Range
The Culebra Range runs almost due north and south, with its northern limit at La Veta Pass in Colorado, and its southern limit at Costilla Creek, just south of Big Costilla Peak in New Mexico. Climbers wishing to ascend Culebra must pay a fee (currently US$150 per person), and the number of climbers per year is limited. It is also the most southerly fourteener in the U.S. Rockies. Standing to the east of the main crest are the two prominent Spanish Peaks (West: ,). These peaks were important landmarks for 19th century travelers on the mountain branch of the Santa Fe Trail. 

The western slope of the Culebras and the San Luis Valley are located within the Sangre de Cristo Land Grant, dating back to the 1840s but still a factor in the pattern of land ownership within the grant. The San Luis Valley is arid.  The town of San Luis, Colorado has an annual precipitation of only .The surrounding area, traversed by Culebra Creek, has a rich agricultural history and has been the scene of land disputes between the descendants of Hispanic settlers and Anglo ranchers since the 1860s.

Taos Mountains
The Taos Mountains span the western lobe of the range from Costilla Creek in the north, to Tres Ritos in the south. Williams Lake is located below Wheeler Peak in the Wheeler Peak Wilderness.

Taos Ski Valley lies just to the west of Wheeler Peak. Much of the central portion of the Taos Mountains is on Taos Pueblo land. As viewed from Taos, they are locally called "Taos Mountain."

The southern portion of the Taos Mountains, between Palo Flechado Pass and Tres Ritos (U.S. Route 64 and NM Route 518), is lower and less dramatic than the northern section, with its high point being Cerro Vista, . The Fernando Mountains are a small subrange lying in this section, just south of US Route 64.

Cimarron Range

The Cimarron Range lies across the Moreno Valley to the east of the Taos Mountains. The Philmont Scout Ranch lies on the east side of the Cimarron Range.

Rincon Mountains
This is a minor subrange, significantly lower than the rest of the Sangre de Cristos; it lies east of the southernmost portion of the Taos Mountains.

Santa Fe Mountains
Rounding out the Sangre de Cristo Mountains are the Santa Fe Mountains, which include all peaks south of NM Route 518. This group lies near Santa Fe and surrounds the Pecos Wilderness, which protects the source watershed of the Pecos River. The peaks include Truchas Peak, as their highest point. Other notable peaks are Santa Fe Baldy and Jicarita Peak. The Pecos Wilderness is crossed by many trails and is popular for backpacking and for fishing in its high alpine lakes.

Prominent peaks

Geology
The Sangre de Cristo Mountains were uplifted during the Cenozoic Laramide orogeny. They are bounded on the west by the Rio Grande rift and on the east by a series of reverse and thrust faults. Vertical displacement along the faults is at least , and gravity measurements suggest the uplift has been thrust eastward great distances. This faulting places Precambrian basement rock in contact with sedimentary strata along the eastern margin of the uplift except where igneous rocks have been intruded along the fault.

See also
Glorieta Pass
Valle Vidal
Vietnam Veterans Memorial State Park
Southern Rocky Mountains

References

Notes

External links

Sangre de Cristo Mountains @ Peakbagger
List of the 13-ers in Sangre de Cristo
NPS—TwHP: “Glorieta and Raton Passes: Gateways to the Southwest” — a National Park Service Teaching with Historic Places (TwHP) lesson plan.

 
Mountain ranges of Colorado
Mountain ranges of New Mexico
Ranges of the Rocky Mountains
Regions of New Mexico
Landforms of Alamosa County, Colorado
Landforms of Costilla County, Colorado
Landforms of Huerfano County, Colorado
Landforms of Saguache County, Colorado
Landforms of Custer County, Colorado
Landforms of Taos County, New Mexico
Landforms of Las Animas County, Colorado
Landforms of Fremont County, Colorado
Landforms of Mora County, New Mexico
Landforms of Rio Arriba County, New Mexico
Baldy
Landforms of Colfax County, New Mexico
Landforms of Pueblo County, Colorado